Harry Vonray Swayne (born February 2, 1965) is a former offensive tackle. He is one of the few players to have started a Super Bowl with three teams: Super Bowl XXIX with the Chargers, Super Bowl XXXIII with the Broncos and Super Bowl XXXV with the Ravens.

He was the chaplain for the Chicago Bears before becoming the assistant player development director for the Baltimore Ravens. Harry and his wife Dawn have five children.

External links
Baltimore Ravens bio

Rutgers Scarlet Knights football players
Tampa Bay Buccaneers players
San Diego Chargers players
Denver Broncos players
Baltimore Ravens players
Miami Dolphins players
American football offensive linemen
Living people
1965 births